In evolutionary biology, inclusive fitness is one of two metrics of evolutionary success as defined by W. D. Hamilton in 1964:

 Personal fitness is the number of offspring that an individual begets (regardless of who rescues/rears/supports them)
 Inclusive fitness is the number of offspring equivalents that an individual rears, rescues or otherwise supports through its behaviour (regardless of who begets them)

An individual's own child, who carries one half of the individual's genes, is defined as one offspring equivalent. A sibling's child, who will carry one-quarter of the individual's genes, is 1/2 offspring equivalent.  Similarly, a cousin's child, who has 1/16 of the individual's genes, is 1/8 offspring equivalent.

From the gene's point of view, evolutionary success ultimately depends on leaving behind the maximum number of copies of itself in the population. Prior to Hamilton's work, it was generally assumed that genes only achieved this through the number of viable offspring produced by the individual organism they occupied. However, this overlooked a wider consideration of a gene's success, most clearly in the case of the social insects where the vast majority of individuals do not produce (their own) offspring.

Overview
Hamilton showed mathematically that, because other members of a population may share one's genes, a gene can also increase its evolutionary success by indirectly promoting the reproduction and survival of other individuals who also carry that gene. This is variously called "kin theory", "kin selection theory" or "inclusive fitness theory". The most obvious category of such individuals is close genetic relatives, and where these are concerned, the application of inclusive fitness theory is often more straightforwardly treated via the narrower kin selection theory.

Hamilton's theory, alongside reciprocal altruism, is considered one of the two primary mechanisms for the evolution of social behaviors in natural species and a major contribution to the field of sociobiology, which holds that some behaviors can be dictated by genes, and therefore can be passed to future generations and may be selected for as the organism evolves.

Although described in seemingly anthropomorphic terms, these ideas apply to all living things, and can describe the evolution of innate and learned behaviors over a wide range of species including insects, small mammals or humans.

Belding's ground squirrel provides an example. The ground squirrel gives an alarm call to warn its local group of the presence of a predator. By emitting the alarm, it gives its own location away, putting itself in more danger. In the process, however, the squirrel may protect its relatives within the local group (along with the rest of the group). Therefore, if the effect of the trait influencing the alarm call typically protects the other squirrels in the immediate area, it will lead to the passing on of more copies of the alarm call trait in the next generation than the squirrel could leave by reproducing on its own. In such a case natural selection will increase the trait that influences giving the alarm call, provided that a sufficient fraction of the shared genes include the gene(s) predisposing to the alarm call.

Synalpheus regalis, a eusocial shrimp, also is an example of an organism whose social traits meet the inclusive fitness criterion. The larger defenders protect the young juveniles in the colony from outsiders. By ensuring the young's survival, the genes will continue to be passed on to future generations.

Inclusive fitness is more generalized than strict kin selection, which requires that the shared genes are identical by descent. Inclusive fitness is not limited to cases where "kin" ('close genetic relatives') are involved.

Hamilton's rule 
In the context of sociobiology, Hamilton proposed that inclusive fitness offers a mechanism for the evolution of altruism. He claimed that this leads natural selection to favor organisms that behave in ways that correlate with maximizing their inclusive fitness. If a gene (or gene complex) promoting altruistic behavior has copies of itself in others, helping those others survive ensures that the genes will be passed on.

Hamilton's rule describes mathematically whether or not a gene for altruistic behavior will spread in a population:

where
  is the probability, above the population average, of the individuals sharing an altruistic gene – commonly viewed as "degree of relatedness".
  is the reproductive benefit to the recipient of the altruistic behavior, and
  is the reproductive cost to the altruist,

Gardner et al. (2007) suggest that Hamilton's rule can be applied to multi-locus models, but that it should be done at the point of interpreting theory, rather than the starting point of enquiry. They suggest that one should "use standard population genetics, game theory, or other methodologies to derive a condition for when the social trait of interest is favored by selection and then use Hamilton's rule as an aid for conceptualizing this result".

Altruism 

The concept serves to explain how natural selection can perpetuate altruism. If there is an "altruism gene" (or complex of genes) that influences an organism's behavior to be helpful and protective of relatives and their offspring, this behavior also increases the proportion of the altruism gene in the population, because relatives are likely to share genes with the altruist due to common descent. In formal terms, if such a complex of genes arises, Hamilton's rule (rbc) specifies the selective criteria (in terms of cost, benefit and relatedness) for such a trait to increase in frequency in the population. Hamilton noted that inclusive fitness theory does not by itself predict that a species will necessarily evolve such altruistic behaviors, since an opportunity or context for interaction between individuals is a more primary and necessary requirement in order for any social interaction to occur in the first place. As Hamilton put it, "Altruistic or selfish acts are only possible when a suitable social object is available. In this sense behaviours are conditional from the start." (Hamilton 1987, 420). In other words, whilst inclusive fitness theory specifies a set of necessary criteria for the evolution of altruistic traits, it does not specify a sufficient condition for their evolution in any given species. More primary necessary criteria include the existence of gene complexes for altruistic traits in gene pool, as mentioned above, and especially that "a suitable social object is available", as Hamilton noted. Paul Sherman, who has contributed much research on the ground squirrels mentioned above, gives a fuller discussion of Hamilton's latter point:

The occurrence of sibling cannibalism in several species underlines the point that inclusive fitness theory should not be understood to simply predict that genetically related individuals will inevitably recognize and engage in positive social behaviors towards genetic relatives. Only in species that have the appropriate traits in their gene pool, and in which individuals typically interacted with genetic relatives in the natural conditions of their evolutionary history, will social behavior potentially be elaborated, and consideration of the evolutionarily typical demographic composition of grouping contexts of that species is thus a first step in understanding how selection pressures upon inclusive fitness have shaped the forms of its social behavior. Dawkins gives a simplified illustration:

Evidence from a variety of species including humans, primates and other social mammals suggests that contextual cues (such as familiarity) are often significant proximate mechanisms mediating the expression of altruistic behavior, regardless of whether the participants are always in fact genetic relatives or not. This is nevertheless evolutionarily stable since selection pressure acts on the typical conditions, not on the rare occasions where actual genetic relatedness differs from that normally encountered (see Sherman above). Inclusive fitness theory thus does not imply that organisms evolve to direct altruism towards genetic relatives. Many popular treatments do however promote this interpretation, as illustrated in a recent review:

Such misunderstandings of inclusive fitness' implications for the study of altruism, even amongst professional biologists utilizing the theory, are widespread, prompting prominent theorists to regularly attempt to highlight and clarify the mistakes. Here is one recent example of attempted clarification from West et al. (2010):

Green-beard effects

As well as interactions in reliable contexts of genetic relatedness, altruists may also have some way to recognize altruistic behavior in unrelated individuals and be inclined to support them. As Dawkins points out in The Selfish Gene (Chapter 6) and The Extended Phenotype, this must be distinguished from the green-beard effect.

The green-beard effect is the act of a gene (or several closely linked genes), that: 
 Produces a phenotype.
 Allows recognition of that phenotype in others.
 Causes the individual to preferentially treat other individuals with the same gene.

The green-beard effect was originally a thought experiment by Hamilton in his publications on inclusive fitness in 1964, although it hadn't yet been observed. As of today, it has been observed in few species. Its rarity is probably due to its susceptibility to 'cheating' whereby individuals can gain the trait that confers the advantage, without the altruistic behavior. This normally would occur via the crossing over of chromosomes which happens frequently, often rendering the green-beard effect a transient state. However, Wang et al. has shown in one of the species where the effect is common (fire ants), recombination cannot occur due to a large genetic transversion, essentially forming a supergene. This, along with homozygote inviability at the green-beard loci allows for the extended maintenance of the green-beard effect.

Equally, cheaters may not be able to invade the green-beard population if the mechanism for preferential treatment and the phenotype are intrinsically linked. In budding yeast (Saccharomyces cerevisiae), the dominant allele FLO1 is responsible for flocculation (self-adherence between cells) which helps protect them against harmful substances such as ethanol. While 'cheater' yeast cells occasionally find their way into the biofilm-like substance that is formed from FLO1 expressing yeast, they cannot invade as the FLO1 expressing yeast will not bind to them in return, and thus the phenotype is intrinsically linked to the preference.

Inclusive fitness
In The Selfish Gene, Dawkins reported that some question the idea that parental investment (parental care) contributes to inclusive fitness. The distinctions between the kind of beneficiaries nurtured (collateral versus descendant relatives) and the kind of fitnesses used (inclusive versus personal) in the parsing of nature are independent concepts. This orthogonality can best be understood in a thought experiment: Consider a model of a population of animals such as crocodiles or tangle web spiders. Some species or populations of these spiders and reptiles exhibit parental care, while closely related species or populations lack it. Assume that in these animals a gene, called a, codes for parental care, and its other allele, called A, codes for an absence thereof. The aa homozygotes care for their young, and AA homozygotes don't, and the heterozygotes behave like aa homozygotes if a is dominant, and like AA homozygotes if A is dominant, or exhibit some kind of intermediate behavior if there is partial dominance. Other kinds of animals could be considered in which all individuals exhibit parental care, but variation among them would be in the quantity and quality thereof.

If one considers a life cycle as extending from conception to conception, and an animal is an offspring of parents with poor parental care, then the higher mortality with poor care could be considered a diminution of the offspring's expected fitness.

Alternatively, if one considers the life cycle as extending from weaning to weaning, the same mortality would be considered a diminution in the parents' fecundity, and therefore a diminution of the parent's fitness.

In Hamilton's paradigm, fitnesses calculated according to in the weaning-to-weaning perspective are inclusive fitnesses, and fitnesses calculated in the conception-to-conception perspective are personal fitnesses. This distinction is independent of whether the altruism involved in child rearing is toward descendants or toward collateral relatives, as when aunts and uncle rear their nieces and nephews.

Inclusive fitness theory was developed in order to better understand collateral altruism, but this does not mean that it is limited to collateral altruism. It applies just as well to parental care. Which perspective one chooses does not affect the animals but just one's understanding.

Parent offspring conflict and optimization 

Early writings on inclusive fitness theory (including Hamilton 1964) used K in place of B/C.  Thus Hamilton's rule was expressed as

is the necessary and sufficient condition for selection for altruism.

Where B is the gain to the beneficiary, C is the cost to the actor and r is the number of its own offspring equivalents the actor expects in one of the offspring of the beneficiary. r is either called the coefficient of relatedness or coefficient of relationship, depending on how it is computed. The method of computing has changed over time, as has the terminology. It is not clear whether or not changes in the terminology followed changes in computation.

Robert L. Trivers (1974) defined "parent-offspring conflict" as any case where

i.e., K is between 1 and 2. The benefit is greater than the cost but is less than twice the cost.

In this case, the parent would wish the offspring to behave as if r is 1 between siblings, although it is actually presumed to be 1/2 or closely approximated by 1/2.

In other words, a parent would wish its offspring to give up ten offspring in order to raise 11 nieces and nephews. The offspring, when not manipulated by the parent, would require at least 21 nieces and nephews to justify the sacrifice of 10 of its own offspring.

The parent is trying to maximize its number of grandchildren, while the offspring is trying to maximize the number of its own offspring equivalents (via offspring and nieces and nephews) it produces. If the parent cannot manipulate the offspring and therefore loses in the conflict, the grandparents with the fewest grandchildren seem to be selected for.  In other words, if the parent has no influence on the offspring's behavior, grandparents with fewer grandchildren increase in frequency in the population.

By extension, parents with the fewest offspring will also increase in frequency.

This seems to go against Ronald A. Fisher's "Fundamental Theorem of Natural Selection" which states that the change in fitness over the course of a generation equals the variance in fitness at the beginning of the generation. Variance is defined as the square of a quantity— standard deviation — and as a square must always be positive (or zero). That would imply that e fitness could never decrease as time passes. This goes along with the intuitive idea that you can't select for lower fitness.

During parent-offspring conflict, the number of stranger equivalents reared per offspring equivalents reared is going down.

It is considerations of this phenomenon that have caused Orlove (1979) and Grafen (2006) to say that nothing is being maximized.

According to Trivers (1974), if Freud had tried to explain intra-family conflict after Hamilton instead of before him, he would have attributed the motivation for the conflict and for the <castration complex> to resource allocation issues rather than sexual jealousy.

Incidentally, when k=1 or k=2, the average number of offspring per parent stays constant as time goes by. When k<1 or k>2 then the average number of offspring per parent increases as time goes by.

The term "gene" can refer to a locus (location) on an organism's DNA—a section that codes for a particular trait. Alternative versions of the code at that location are called "alleles." If there are two alleles at a locus, one of which codes for altruism and the other for selfishness, an individual who has one of each is said to be a heterozygote at that locus. If the heterozygote uses half of its resources raising its own offspring and the other half helping its siblings raise theirs, that condition is called codominance. If there is codominance the "2" in the above argument is exactly 2.

If by contrast, the altruism allele is more dominant, then the 2 in the above would be replaced by a number smaller than 2. If the selfishness allele is the more dominant, something greater than 2 would replace the 2. (Orlove 1975)

Criticism
A 2010 paper by Martin Nowak, Corina Tarnita, and E. O. Wilson suggested that standard natural selection theory is superior to inclusive fitness theory, stating that the interactions between cost and benefit cannot be explained only in terms of relatedness. This, Nowak said, makes Hamilton's rule at worst superfluous and at best ad hoc. Gardner in turn was critical of the paper, describing it as "a really terrible article", and along with other co-authors has written a reply, submitted to Nature.

In work prior to Nowak et al. However, he published an unrelated derivation of the same formula for  – a derivation designed to preserve two statements about the rate of selection – which on its own was similarly ad hoc. Orlove argued that the existence of two unrelated derivations of the formula for  reduces or eliminates the ad hoc nature of the formula, and of inclusive fitness theory as well. The derivations were demonstrated to be unrelated by corresponding parts of the two identical formulae for  being derived from the genotypes of different individuals. By contrast, the terms left of the minus sign in both derivations come from the same source.
One study suggest the c/b ratio be considered as a continuum of this behavioral trait rather than discontinuous in nature. From this approach fitness transactions can be better observed because there is more to what is happening to affect an individual's fitness than just losing and gaining (Engles, W.R. 1982).

See also
 Criticism of evolutionary psychology
 Evolutionary psychology
 Gene-centered view of evolution
 Hamiltonian spite
 Kin selection
 Reproductive success
 r/K selection theory

References

Further reading
 Campbell, N., Reece, J., et al. 2002. Biology. 6th ed. San Francisco, California. pp. 1145–1148.
 Engles, W. R. "Evolution of Altruistic Behavior by Kin Selection: An Alternative Approach". Proceedings of the National Academy of Sciences of the United States of America. Vol. 80 No.2 (1983): 515-518.
 Dawkins, Richard C. 1976. The Selfish Gene. Oxford University Press (Discussion of carers and bearers in relation to inclusive and personal fitnesses, and the bugbear of parental investment as part of inclusive fitness occurs herein)
 Hamilton, W. D. 1964. "The Genetical Evolution of Social Behaviour I and II". J. Theor. Biol. v7, pp. 1–16, and 17-52.
 Hamilton, W. D. 1975. "Innate Social Aptitudes of Man: an Approach from Evolutionary Genetics". In Robin Fox (ed.) Biosocial Anthropology. London: Malaby Press, 133-153 (IF including altruism to fellow altruists among strangers discussed)
 Hamilton, W. D. Narrow Roads of Geneland I and II, 1995 Freeman I 2001 Oxford Press II (biography of WDH and anthology of his writings)
 Rheingold, Howard. "Technologies of cooperation". In Smart Mobs. Cambridge, Massachusetts: Perseus Publishing, 2002, Ch. 2: pp. 29–61.
 Sherman, P. W. 2001. "Squirrels" (pp. 598–609, with L. Wauters) and "The Role of Kinship" (pp. 610–611) in  D. W. Macdonald (Ed.) Encyclopedia of Mammals. UK: Andromeda.
 Trivers, R. L. 1971. "The Evolution of Reciprocal Altruism". Quarterly Review of Biology 46: 35-57.
 Trivers, R. L. 1972. "Parental Investment and Sexual Selection". In B. Campbell (ed.), Sexual Selection and the Descent of Man, 1871-1971. Chicago, Il: Aldine, pp. 136–179.
 Trivers, R. L. 1974. "Parent/Offspring Conflict". American Zoologist, 14 249-264. (Importance of If in understanding intra-family conflict)

Evolutionary biology concepts

de:Gesamtfitness